Pärnu Castle was a castle in Pärnu, in nowadays Estonia.
Also currently called "The Red Tower," it was built in the 15th century originally as a prison. It is the last defensive tower remaining of the Hanseactic town "New-Pärnu." In the 17th century, the tower had four stories and a prison cell 6 meters deep. In the 19th century, it was used as the town archives. Only 3 stories remain.

See also
List of castles in Estonia

References

Castles in Estonia
Buildings and structures in Pärnu
Tourist attractions in Pärnu County